Campanal may refer to either:
Campanal I, Spanish footballer (full name: Guillermo González del Río García)
Campanal II, Spanish footballer (full name: Marcelino Vaquero González)